Carcharodon (meaning "jagged/sharp tooth") is a genus of sharks within the family Lamnidae, colloquially called the "white sharks." The only extant member is the great white shark (Carcharodon carcharias). The extant species was preceded by a number of fossil (extinct) species including C. hubbelli and C. hastalis. The first appearance of the genus may have been as early as the Early Miocene or Late Oligocene.

Fossil History and Evolution 
The fossil ancestry of Carcharodon remains an active area of research and debate, given the dearth of the fossil record and the incompleteness of found specimens. Most fossil remains of Carcharodon are in the form of teeth, with some vertebral centra; as is the norm for fossil Chondrichthyans, since soft tissues don't preserve well, and a shark's skeleton is made of cartilage. Thus, assessing relationships between fossil species relies largely on the form of their teeth. This difficulty is compounded by the necessarily incomplete fossil record of Lamnids. However, some researchers have proffered Macrorhizodus, Isurolamna, and Cretalamna as candidates for genera ancestral to Carcharodon, taxa ranging from the Eocene to the Cretaceous.

Carcharodon is well-represented in the fossil record by the Middle Miocene. The first widespread, cosmopolitan species being C. hastalis, with fossils recovered from North America, South America, Europe, Australia, and Asia. The modern great white shark has been posited to have evolved from C. hastalis, through a transitional species, C. hubbelli.

Study of white shark taxonomy is complicated by nomenclature and repeated taxonomic reassignments of various species. C. hastalis, C. subserratus, and C. planus traditionally were placed in Isurus, given their superficial similarity to the teeth of mako sharks, leading many shark tooth collectors even in the present to refer to these extinct species as "makos." They were later reassigned to a new genus, Cosmopolitodus, a genus maintained as valid in some current literature, and considered a junior synonym of Carcharodon in others. C. hastalis has also been described as two morphotypes, "broad-form" and "narrow-form," which some authors have split into two species, C. plicatilis (xiphodon) and C. hastalis, respectively. C. subserratus has also been placed in yet another related genus, Carcharomodus, as C. escheri (the historically-used species name), but has recently been placed back in Carcharodon as C. subserratus.

The fossil "mega-toothed" sharks like megalodon have also traditionally been placed in Carcharodon, but most current literature refutes this position, placing mega-toothed sharks in a separate family, Otodontidae, and genus, Otodus (Carcharocles).

Species
 Carcharodon carcharias (Linnaeus, 1758) (the great white shark)
†Carcharodon hubbelli (Ehret et al., 2012) (Hubbell's white shark)
†Carcharodon hastalis (Agassiz, 1843)
†Carcharodon planus (Agassiz, 1856)
†Carcharodon subserratus (escheri) (Agassiz, 1843)
†Carcharodon ?plicatilis (xiphodon) (Agassiz, 1843)

References

 
Taxa named by Andrew Smith (zoologist)
Shark genera
Fish genera with one living species